The 2010 Florida Atlantic University Owls football team represented Florida Atlantic University in the 2010 NCAA Division I FBS football season. The team was coached by Howard Schnellenberger and played their home games at Lockhart Stadium in Fort Lauderdale, Florida. This was the tenth season of intercollegiate football at Florida Atlantic University and was its fifth season of competition in the Sun Belt Conference. They finished the season 4–8, 3–5 in Sun Belt play.

Schedule

NFL Draft
3rd Round, 69th Overall Pick by the Arizona Cardinals—Sr. TE Rob Housler

References

Florida Atlantic
Florida Atlantic Owls football seasons
Florida Atlantic Owls football